In the area of modern algebra known as group theory, the Conway groups are the three sporadic simple groups Co1, Co2 and Co3 along with the related finite group Co0 introduced by .

The largest of the Conway groups, Co0, is the group of automorphisms of the Leech lattice Λ with respect to addition and inner product.  It has order

 

but it is not a simple group.  The simple group Co1 of order

  =  221395472111323

is defined as the quotient of Co0 by its center, which consists of the scalar matrices ±1. The groups Co2 of order 

 =  218365371123

and Co3 of order 

 =  210375371123
 
consist of the automorphisms of Λ fixing a lattice vector of type 2 and type 3, respectively.  As the scalar −1 fixes no non-zero vector, these two groups are isomorphic to subgroups of Co1.

The inner product on the Leech lattice is defined as 1/8 the sum of the products of respective co-ordinates of the two multiplicand vectors; it is an integer. The square norm of a vector is its inner product with itself, always an even integer. It is common to speak of the type of a Leech lattice vector: half the square norm. Subgroups are often named in reference to the types of relevant fixed points.  This lattice has no vectors of type 1.

History

 relates how, in about 1964, John Leech investigated close packings of spheres in Euclidean spaces of large dimension. One of Leech's discoveries was a lattice packing in 24-space, based on what came to be called the Leech lattice Λ. He wondered whether his lattice's symmetry group contained an interesting simple group, but felt he needed the help of someone better acquainted with group theory. He had to do much asking around because the mathematicians were pre-occupied with agendas of their own. John Conway agreed to look at the problem. John G. Thompson said he would be interested if he were given the order of the group. Conway expected to spend months or years on the problem, but found results in just a few sessions.

 stated that he found the Leech lattice in 1940 and hinted that he calculated the order of its automorphism group Co0.

Monomial subgroup N of Co0
Conway started his investigation of Co0 with a subgroup he called N, a holomorph of the (extended) binary Golay code (as diagonal matrices with 1 or −1 as diagonal elements) by the Mathieu group M24 (as permutation matrices). .

A standard representation, used throughout this article, of the binary Golay code arranges the 24 co-ordinates so that 6 consecutive blocks (tetrads) of 4 constitute a sextet.

The matrices of Co0 are orthogonal; i. e., they leave the inner product invariant. The inverse is the transpose. Co0 has no matrices of determinant −1.

The Leech lattice can easily be defined as the Z-module generated by the set Λ2 of all vectors of type 2, consisting of
 (4, 4, 022)
 (28, 016)
 (−3, 123)

and their images under N. Λ2 under N falls into 3 orbits of sizes 1104, 97152, and 98304. Then . Conway strongly suspected that Co0 was transitive on Λ2, and indeed he found a new matrix, not monomial and not an integer matrix.

Let η be the 4-by-4 matrix

Now let ζ be a block sum of 6 matrices: odd numbers each of η and −η. ζ is a symmetric and orthogonal matrix, thus an involution. Some experimenting shows that it interchanges vectors between different orbits of N.

To compute |Co0| it is best to consider Λ4, the set of vectors of type 4. Any type 4 vector is one of exactly 48 type 4 vectors congruent to each other modulo 2Λ, falling into 24 orthogonal pairs  A set of 48 such vectors is called a frame or cross. N has as an orbit a standard frame of 48 vectors of form (±8, 023). The subgroup fixing a given frame is a conjugate of N. The group 212, isomorphic to the Golay code, acts as sign changes on vectors of the frame, while M24 permutes the 24 pairs of the frame. Co0 can be shown to be transitive on Λ4. Conway multiplied the order 212|M24| of N by the number of frames, the latter being equal to the quotient . That product is the order of any subgroup of Co0 that properly contains N; hence N is a maximal subgroup of Co0 and contains 2-Sylow subgroups of Co0. N also is the subgroup in Co0 of all matrices with integer components.

Since Λ includes vectors of the shape , Co0 consists of rational matrices whose denominators are all divisors of 8.

The smallest non-trivial representation of Co0 over any field is the 24-dimensional one coming from the Leech lattice, and this is faithful over fields of characteristic other than 2.

Involutions in Co0
Any involution in Co0 can be shown to be conjugate to an element of the Golay code. Co0 has 4 conjugacy classes of involutions.

A permutation matrix of shape 212 can be shown to be conjugate to a dodecad. Its centralizer has the form 212:M12 and has conjugates inside the monomial subgroup. Any matrix in this conjugacy class has trace 0.

A permutation matrix of shape 2818 can be shown to be conjugate to an octad; it has trace 8. This and its negative (trace −8) have a common centralizer of the form , a subgroup maximal in Co0.

Sublattice groups
Conway and Thompson found that four recently discovered sporadic simple groups, described in conference proceedings , were isomorphic to subgroups or quotients of subgroups of Co0.

Conway himself employed a notation for stabilizers of points and subspaces where he prefixed a dot. Exceptional were .0 and .1, being Co0 and Co1. For integer  let .n denote the stabilizer of a point of type n (see above) in the Leech lattice.

Conway then named stabilizers of planes defined by triangles having the origin as a vertex. Let .hkl be the pointwise stabilizer of a triangle with edges (differences of vertices) of types h, k and l. The triangle is commonly called an h-k-l triangle.  In the simplest cases Co0 is transitive on the points or triangles in question and stabilizer groups are defined up to conjugacy.

Conway identified .322 with the McLaughlin group McL (order ) and .332 with the Higman–Sims group HS (order ); both of these had recently been discovered.

Here is a table of some sublattice groups:

Two other sporadic groups
Two sporadic subgroups can be defined as quotients of stabilizers of structures on the Leech lattice. Identifying R24 with C12 and Λ with

 

the resulting automorphism group (i.e., the group of Leech lattice automorphisms preserving the complex structure) when divided by the six-element group of complex scalar matrices, gives the Suzuki group Suz (order ). This group was discovered by Michio Suzuki in 1968.

A similar construction gives the Hall–Janko group J2 (order ) as the quotient of the group of quaternionic automorphisms of Λ by the group ±1 of scalars.

The seven simple groups described above comprise what Robert Griess calls the second generation of the Happy Family, which consists of the 20 sporadic simple groups found within the Monster group. Several of the seven groups contain at least some of the five Mathieu groups, which comprise the first generation.

Suzuki chain of product groups
Co0 has 4 conjugacy classes of elements of order 3. In M24 an element of shape 38 generates a group normal in a copy of S3, which commutes with a simple subgroup of order 168. A direct product  in M24 permutes the octads of a trio and permutes 14 dodecad diagonal matrices in the monomial subgroup. In Co0 this monomial normalizer  is expanded to a maximal subgroup of the form , where 2.A9 is the double cover of the alternating group A9.

John Thompson pointed out it would be fruitful to investigate the normalizers of smaller subgroups of the form 2.An . Several other maximal subgroups of Co0 are found in this way. Moreover, two sporadic groups appear in the resulting chain.

There is a subgroup , the only one of this chain not maximal in Co0. Next there is the subgroup . Next comes . The unitary group SU3(3) (order ) possesses a graph of 36 vertices, in anticipation of the next subgroup. The aforementioned graph expands to the Hall–Janko graph, with 100 vertices. Next comes , G2(4) being an exceptional group of Lie type.

The chain ends with 6.Suz:2 (Suz=Suzuki sporadic group), which, as mentioned above, respects a complex representation of the Leech Lattice.

Generalized Monstrous Moonshine

Conway and Norton suggested in their 1979 paper that monstrous moonshine is not limited to the monster. Larissa Queen and others subsequently found that one can construct the expansions of many Hauptmoduln from simple combinations of dimensions of sporadic groups.  For the Conway groups, the relevant McKay–Thompson series is  = {1, 0, 276, …} and  = {1, 0, 276, …} where one can set the constant term ,

and η(τ) is the Dedekind eta function.

References 

 

 Reprinted in 

 
 Atlas of Finite Group Representations: Co1 version 2
 Atlas of Finite Group Representations: Co1 version 3

R. T. Curtis and B. T. Fairburn (2009), "Symmetric Representation of the elements of the Conway Group .0", Journal of Symbolic Computation, 44: 1044-1067.

Sporadic groups
John Horton Conway